Kimmo Paavali Kinnunen (born 31 March 1968) is a Finnish former javelin thrower. He won gold at the 1991 World Championships in Tokyo and silver at the 1993 World Championships in Stuttgart.

His other achievements include a 4th-place finish at the 1992 Summer Olympics in Barcelona and 7th-place finish at the 1996 Summer Olympics in Atlanta. His personal best is 90.82 from the 1991 World Championships.

Kimmo Kinnunen is son of javelin thrower Jorma Kinnunen.

International competitions

Seasonal bests by year
1986 - 71.72
1987 - 72.94
1988 - 80.24
1989 - 83.10
1990 - 81.46
1991 - 90.82
1992 - 83.42
1993 - 84.78
1994 - 79.34
1995 - 82.64
1996 - 85.32
1997 - 82.48
1998 - 84.23
1999 - 85.96
2000 - 81.41
2001 - 81.35
2002 - 80.39
2003 - 74.54

References

1968 births
Living people
People from Äänekoski
Finnish male javelin throwers
Olympic athletes of Finland
Athletes (track and field) at the 1988 Summer Olympics
Athletes (track and field) at the 1992 Summer Olympics
Athletes (track and field) at the 1996 Summer Olympics
World Athletics Championships athletes for Finland
World Athletics Championships medalists
World Athletics Championships winners
Sportspeople from Central Finland
20th-century Finnish people
21st-century Finnish people